Soukarya Ghosal (born 7 June 1986) is an Indian filmmaker, director, screenwriter, illustrator and music composer. He is widely considered for his work in Rainbow Jelly, a food fantasy film for the children in Bengali Cinema. His first feature film was Pendulum, bagged three awards in the 4th Mirchi Music Awards Bangla 2014 by Radio Mirchi.

Ghosal made His second film Load shedding which he wrote and directed for Zee Bangla Cinema Originals, was a teenage love story set in the 90's.

His film Rainbow Jelly, a food fantasy film about an autistic orphan received Hiralal Sen Award and Rituparno Ghosh Memorial Award for Most Promising Director from West Bengal Film Journalists' Association Awards. His upcoming films are OCD and Kalantar.

Early life
Ghosal was born and brought up in Kolkata. He attended A. K. Ghosh Memorial School and Jodhpur Park Boys School, and graduated in History from Asutosh College. He did a postgraduate course in Media Studies from University of Calcutta. His admiration for Satyajit Ray's illustrations in Sandesh magazine was a guiding force in his desire to become a professional illustrator.

Career
In 2011, he joined Robbar the Sunday magazine of Sangbad Pratidin as a staff cartoonist and Illustrator. While working on comic series such as Tenida in Sandesh and Tenali Rama in Kishore Bharati, he felt a strong urge for sound and motion in his art. This led him to quit his job and pursue films. Coming directly from the field of art, Ghosal made his first film, Pendulum based on a surrealist painter who could physically take people into the space he drew. It took him a year to find a producer for the film.

2014–2015 
On 7 March 2014, his debut film Pendulum, based on magic realism & time travel was released in West Bengal. This hyperlink film featured Radhika Apte, Rajesh Sharma, Sreelekha Mitra, Rajatabha Dutta, Subhasish Mukherjee, Shantilal Mukherjee, Samadarshi Dutta and Anindiya Banerjee, and was produced by Cozum Analytics Ltd.

In 2015, he made his second film, Load shedding, for television. A teenage love story set in the 90s, it starred Riddhi Sen, Meghla Dasgupta, Bidipta Chakraborty, Saili Bhattacharya and Joydeep Kundu, and was produced by Nideas Creations.

2016–2018 
In 2016, he adapted the story of Taranath Tantrik by Bibhutibhushan Bandyopadhyay to rewrite for a television series for Colors Bangla. That year, he worked as the second unit director in Srijit Mukherji's Zulfiqar, produced by Shree Venkatesh Films.

Inspired by the literary world of Leela Majumdar in 2017, his film production company Indigenous produced Rainbow Jelly, a food fantasy in Bengali starring Mahabrata Basu, Anumegha Banerjee, Kaushik Sen, Sreelekha Mitra, Shantilal Mukherjee etc.. The film was based on an autistic orphan child who could control the human mind by cooking food with several tastes. The film depicted the gradual changes in the villain's mind and his seven different reactions as he encountered different kinds of tastes: sweet, sour, salty, spicy, pungent, astringent and bitter. Rainbow Jelly film got released in West Bengal on 25 May 2018 & got premiered in London & Bahrain. The film received Hiralal Sen award for best Bengali film of 2018 from FFSI (Federation of Film Societies of India). Ghosal received the Most Promising Director Award from West Bengal Film Journalists' Association Awards, for Rainbow Jelly.

In November 2018 Ghosal made emotional thriller Rawkto Rawhoshyo produced by Surinder Films starred Koel Mallick, Lily Chakravarty, Chandan Roy Sanyal, Rwitobroto Mukherjee, Shantilal Mukherjee, Basabdatta Chatterjee etc.

2019–present 
In August 2019 he made his fifth feature film Bhoot Pori a horror fantasy. This is a biography of a ghost who came into existence after the death of a Bengali widow in the eve of the Independence Day of India. The film starred Jaya Ahsan, Ritwick Chakraborty, Sudipta Chakraborty, Shantilal Mukherjee, Bishantak Mukherjee etc.

Rawkto Rawhoshyo was released in theatres on  21 October 2020 during Durga Puja. The film was initially scheduled to release on 10 April 2020, but was postponed due to the COVID-19 pandemic.

Filmography

Films

Awards and Nominations

References

External links
 
 
 
 

Living people
1986 births
University of Calcutta alumni
Bengali film directors
21st-century Indian film directors
Bengali screenwriters
Screenwriters from Kolkata
Film directors from Kolkata
21st-century Indian dramatists and playwrights
Indian screenwriters
21st-century Indian screenwriters